The 2007–08 season is FC Metalist Kharkiv's 63rd season in existence and the club's 4th consecutive season in the top flight of Ukrainian football. In addition to the domestic league, Metalist Kharkiv participated in that season's editions of the Ukrainian Cup and the UEFA Cup. The season covers the period from 1 July 2007 to 30 June 2008.

Players

First team squad
Squad at end of season

Left club during season

Competitions

Overall record

Vyshcha Liha

League table

Results summary

Results by round

Results

Ukrainian Cup

UEFA Cup

First round

References

FC Metalist Kharkiv
FC Metalist Kharkiv seasons